Rulers of the Sea is a 1939 American historical drama film directed by Frank Lloyd and starring Douglas Fairbanks Jr., Margaret Lockwood and Will Fyffe. The film was made by Paramount Pictures, but featured Lockwood and Fyffe who were two of the leading stars of the British Gainsborough Pictures studios. The supporting cast features Alan Ladd.

Plot

Cast

 Douglas Fairbanks, Jr. as David 'Davie' Gillespie 
 Margaret Lockwood as Mary Shaw 
 Will Fyffe as John Shaw 
 George Bancroft as Captain Oliver 
 Montagu Love as Malcolm Grant 
 Vaughan Glaser as Junius Smith 
 David Torrence as Donald Fenton 
 Lester Matthews as Lt. Roberts 
 Alec Craig as Foreman MacNeil 
 Barlowe Borland as Magistrate 
 Wilson Benge as Campbell 
 Harry Allen as Murdock 
 Barry Macollum as Miller 
 David Cavendish as First Officer Lewis  
 David Clyde as Second Mate Evans 
 Charles McAvoy as O'Brien 
 Alan Ladd as Colin Farrell 
 Lawrence Grant as Mr. Negley 
 John Power as Captain of 'Dog Star' 
 William Haade as A Stoker

Production
The film was one in a series of million-dollar "spectacles" from Paramount. It was based on the history of the Cunard Line. This subject matter was inspired by the success of the movie Lloyd's of London, which led to a series of movies revolving around the history of companies. (Others from this time include Spawn of the North (1938), Western Union (1940), and Hudson Bay Company (1940).)

The film used the writer and director of the hit MGM film Mutiny on the Bounty (1935), Talbot Jennings and Frank Lloyd.

Will Fyffe, British film star, was borrowed from Gainsborough Pictures in the US to play engineer John Shaw. Filming started on his arrival in Hollywood on 19 April 1939. Margaret Lockwood had also been borrowed from Gainborough.

The film used two real ships.

The film was made with the British audience in mind, so Paramount were worried on the declaration of war.

Reception
Fairbanks Jr called it "a very boring story... very static. Lost a bundle."

References

External links

Review of film at Variety

1939 films
1930s English-language films
Films directed by Frank Lloyd
Films set in the 19th century
Paramount Pictures films
Seafaring films
American black-and-white films
American historical drama films
1930s historical drama films
Films set in Scotland
Films set in London
1939 drama films
1930s American films